Alex Harvey (born 7 September 1988) is a retired Canadian cross-country skier who competed between 2005 and 2019. Harvey is also a member of the Quebec Provincial Cycling Team.

Career
In 2008 Harvey finished third both in the (Team sprint: Whistler Olympic Park, and the 50 km: Trondheim). He also competed at the FIS Nordic World Ski Championships 2009 in Liberec, finishing fifth in the 4 x 10 km, 22nd in the 15 km + 15 km double pursuit, 28th in the individual sprint, and 36th in the 15 km events.

In the Vancouver 2010 Winter Olympics, Harvey finished fourth in the team sprint with teammate Devon Kershaw. This is the best placing ever for Canadian men in an Olympic cross-country competition. In the men's 4 x 10 km relay, Harvey and Canada finished seventh.

At the 2011 U-23 Worlds, Harvey the 30 km pursuit race.

At the 30 km pursuit in the 2011 World Championships in Oslo, Norway, Harvey took the lead early on in the freestyle portion of the race, but lost the lead with 2 km to go finishing at 13th place. Three days later, he won gold medal in the team sprint together with Devon Kershaw. At the men's 50 km freestyle Harvey finished fifth, after falling in the Feed Zone after 3 kilometres. He then won a silver medal at the 2011–12 Tour de Ski in Val di Fiemme, Italy, in stage 8 at the 20 km classical mass start.

During the 2013–14 Tour de Ski, Harvey succeeds three podium finishes (one first place, one second place and one third place), including a win at the 4,5 km classic technique prologue in Oberhof, Germany. He ends the competition in third place of the Tour de Ski sprint standing with 62 pts, getting a bronze medal. Then, he won a bronze medal at the FIS Nordic World Ski Championships 2013 in the individual sprint event, finishing 0,1 second behind winner Petter Northug.

He finished third overall of the 2013–14 FIS Cross-Country World Cup rankings, succeeds six podium finishes (three first places, two second places and one third place), including a win in Oberhof, Szklarska Poręba and at the World Cup Final in Falun. At the 2015 Tour de Ski, he won a silver medal in stage 6 at the 10 km individual classic.

At the FIS Nordic World Ski Championships 2015 in Falun, Sweden, Harvey won a silver medal in the individual sprint classic and a bronze medal in the 15f/15c skiathlon (30K pursuit) events.

He won the gold medal in the 50-kilometre freestyle race at the 2017 cross-country skiing world championships in Lahti, Finland, the first North American to do so since the event began in 1925.

In February 2019, Harvey announced that he was going to retire at the end of the 2019 season.

Cross-country skiing results
All results are sourced from the International Ski Federation (FIS).

Olympic Games

World Championships
 5 medals – (2 gold, 1 silver, 2 bronze)

World Cup

Season standings

Individual podiums
 8 victories – (2 , 6 ) 
 30 podiums – (12 , 18 )

Team podiums
 1 victory – (1 ) 
 3 podiums – (1 , 2 )

References

External links
  
 
 
 
 

1988 births
Cross-country skiers at the 2010 Winter Olympics
Cross-country skiers at the 2014 Winter Olympics
Cross-country skiers at the 2018 Winter Olympics
Canadian male cross-country skiers
Living people
Olympic cross-country skiers of Canada
FIS Nordic World Ski Championships medalists in cross-country skiing
Sportspeople from Quebec
People from Capitale-Nationale
Tour de Ski skiers
Université Laval alumni